5-MeO-DMT (5-methoxy-N,N-dimethyltryptamine) or O-methyl-bufotenin is a psychedelic of the tryptamine class. It is found in a wide variety of plant species, and also is secreted by the glands of at least one toad species, the Colorado River toad. Like its close relatives DMT and bufotenin (5-HO-DMT), it has been used as an entheogen in South America. Slang terms include Five-methoxy, The power, and Toad venom.

Chemistry
5-MeO-DMT was first synthesized in 1936, and in 1959 it was isolated as one of the psychoactive ingredients of Anadenanthera peregrina seeds used in preparing Yopo snuff. It was once believed to be a major component of the psychoactive effects of the snuff, although this has recently been shown to be unlikely, due to the limited or sometimes even non-existent quantity contained within the seeds, which instead achieve their psychoactivity from the O-demethylated metabolite of 5-MeO-DMT, bufotenin. It is metabolized mainly by CYP2D6.

Effects
Depending on whether smoked or insufflated, total duration of experience can last between 10 minutes for the former, or up to 2 hours for the latter.  Effects vary and can range from radical perspective shifting and perception of new insights, euphoria, immersive experiences, dissociation and non-responsiveness, sensual/erotic enhancement, to dysphoria, fear, terror, and panic.

Uses
It has anti-anxiety and anti-depressant effects.

Religious use

The Church of the Tree of Life, founded in California in 1971 by John Mann but now defunct, declared the use of 5-MeO-DMT to be a sacrament. From approximately 1971 to the late 1980s, 5-MeO-DMT was discreetly available to its members. Between 1970 and 1990, smoking of 5-MeO-DMT on parsley was probably one of the two most common forms of ingestion in the United States.

Pharmacology
5-MeO-DMT is a methoxylated derivative of DMT. While most common psychedelics are believed to primarily elicit psychological effects through agonism of serotonin 5-HT2A receptors, 5-MeO-DMT shows 1000-fold greater affinity for 5-HT1A over 5-HT2A; In line with its affinity for 5-HT1A receptors, 5-MeO-DMT is extremely potent at suppressing the firing of dorsal raphe 5-HT neurons.  Further, its activity in rats was attenuated with the 5-HT1A selective antagonist WAY-100635 while 5-HT2A selective antagonist volinanserin failed to demonstrate any change.  Additional mechanisms of action such as inhibition of monoamine reuptake may be involved. A 2019 European study with 42 volunteers showed that a single inhalation produced sustained enhancement of satisfaction with life, and easing of anxiety, depression, and post-traumatic stress disorder (PTSD).

In 2018, researchers also discovered that 5-MeO-DMT is a psychoplastogen, which refers to a compound capable of promoting rapid and sustained neural plasticity.

Research

Neurogenesis

A 2018 study demonstrated that a single dose of 5-MeO-DMT induced neurogenesis in mice.

Clinical Development
5-MeO-DMT is being developed and evaluated for potential therapeutic effects in patients with Treatment-Resistant Depression (TRD). Biopharmaceutical company GH Research has sponsored a completed phase 1 study in healthy volunteers and phase 1/2 study in TRD patients where 87.5% of patients with TRD were brought into remission on day 7 in the phase 2 part of the study. GH Research is currently planning a phase 2b study in TRD patients and have received approval for studies in patients with bipolar II disorder and a current depressive episode and patients with postpartum depression.

Beckley Psytech in collaboration with King's College London research the safety and tolerability of intranasal 5-MeO-DMT in healthy subjects, in a phase 1 study. Beckley Psytech CEO Cosmo Feilding-Mellen sees a potential in the short-acting nature of 5-MeO-DMT compared to psilocybin: "Requiring one or two therapists to sit in a room with a single patient for the entire duration of an MDMA or psilocybin experience, which is essentially a whole working day, is probably going to be very resource-intensive and expensive. There is already a global shortage of psychotherapists, and this poses a potential bottleneck to patient access in the future."

Sources

5-MeO-DMT can be produced synthetically.

Legal status

China

As of October 2015, 5-MeO-DMT is a controlled substance in China.

Australia
As a structural analog of N,N-dimethyltryptamine (DMT), 5-MeO-DMT is a Schedule 9 prohibited substance under the Poisons Standard.

Sweden
Sveriges riksdags health ministry Statens folkhälsoinstitut classified 5-MeO-DMT, listed as 5-metoxi-N,N-dimetyltryptamin (5-MeO-DMT) in their regulation SFS 2004:696,  as "health hazard" under the act Lagen om förbud mot vissa hälsofarliga varor (translated Act on the Prohibition of Certain Goods Dangerous to Health) in October 2004, making it illegal to sell or possess.

Germany
As of 2001 5-MeO-DMT is listed as a controlled substance. Attachement I BtMG. BGBl. I 2001, 1180 - 1186;

Turkey
5-MeO-DMT has been controlled in Turkey since December 2013.

United States
5-MeO-DMT was made a Schedule I controlled substance in January 2011.

See also 
 4-MeO-DMT
 5-MeO-AMT
 5-MeO-DIPT
 5-EtO-DMT
 5-MeO-MET
 Dimemebfe
 EMDT
 Hamilton's Pharmacopeia
 List of entheogens
 Psychoplastogen

References

External links 
 TiHKAL #38 on Erowid and Erowid's 5-MeO-DMT Vault
 5-MeO-DMT Entry in TiHKAL • info
 Free Harm Reduction Courses
 5-MeO-DMT Harm Reduction Forums

Ayahuasca
Entheogens
Psychedelic tryptamines
Tryptamine alkaloids
Indole ethers at the benzene ring
Serotonin receptor agonists
Psychedelic drugs
Designer drugs
Dimethylamino compounds